The Warrington Site is a prehistoric Native American site in Sussex County, Delaware.  It is located east of County Road 274 on Warrington Neck, west of Rehoboth Beach.  It encompasses a Native camp that was used on a seasonal or temporary basis for food production, and dates to the Woodland period, roughly between AD 1100 and AD 1370.  Features found at the site include pits, apparently used for storage, that were carefully lined with shells.

The site was listed on the National Register of Historic Places in 1977.

See also
National Register of Historic Places listings in Sussex County, Delaware

References

Archaeological sites on the National Register of Historic Places in Delaware
Sussex County, Delaware
National Register of Historic Places in Sussex County, Delaware
Woodland period